Aceprometazine (INN) is a phenothiazine derivative prescription drug with neuroleptic and anti-histamine properties It is not widely prescribed, and may be associated with drug-induced Parkinsonism. It may be used in combination with meprobamate for the treatment of sleep disorders. This combination is available in France under the trade name Mepronizine.

It is structurally related to the phenothiazine derivative veterinary drug acepromazine.

Synthesis
 The reason for the rearrangement in the sidechain between the precursor and the product is on account of a methadone-type aziridine.

2-Acetylphenothiazine [6631-94-3] (1)
2-Chloropropyldimethylamine [108-14-5] (2)

References

D2 antagonists
Phenothiazines
H1 receptor antagonists
Aromatic ketones